SARTA, (Stark Area Regional Transit Authority), is a public sector transit agency servicing Stark County, a county in Ohio containing Canton, Alliance, and Massillon. In addition to its regular line service within Stark County, SARTA runs one bus route (with multiple times) between Canton and downtown Akron, connecting to Akron's METRO RTA bus system and also serving the Akron-Canton Regional Airport from both cities and one route to Cleveland starting March 4, 2013.

SARTA's administrative office and bus garage are located in Canton. It is managed by CEO/Executive Director Kirt Conrad, as well as a 9-member board of trustees.  SARTA is primarily funded by a county 0.25% sales tax which was first approved in 1997 and renewed in 2002, 2006 and 2011.

History 
On December 1, 1997, the Canton Regional Transit Authority became the Stark Area Regional Transit Authority (SARTA) and service to all of Stark County was established.

SARTA is governed by a nine-member Board of Trustees with the Executive Director/CEO serving as Secretary/Treasurer. The members are appointed to a three-year consecutive term. Appointments are made by the Stark County Council of Government, Stark County Commissioners, and the cities of Canton, Massillon and Alliance.

SARTA employed approximately 190 individuals as of June 15, 2012. The position breakdown is approximately 63% Coach Operators, 12% Mechanics and Service Personnel (who service a fleet of 80 revenue buses and 12 non-revenue service vehicles), 25% Administrative Staff and a couple Part-time Employees and/or Interns.

As SARTA grew, satellite offices were added to better serve the county's public transportation needs. SARTA established four transfer stations and customer service offices. The Alliance Transfer Center was created to serve northeastern Stark County. The Massillon Transfer Center was created to serve the southwestern part of the county. The downtown Canton Transfer Center (also known as Cornerstone) was created to serve the heart of Stark County. The Belden Village Transit Center was opened to serve the Belden Village shopping area, as well as businesses and local colleges.

Transit Centers 
Cornerstone Transit Center in downtown Canton is the main transfer hub for SARTA. It is located in downtown Canton at 112 Cherry Avenue SE at the corner of Cherry Avenue and East Tuscarawas Street. Operations began on August 6, 2003. The center is named Cornerstone. The new transit center includes both an indoor customer service center and an outdoor bus-boarding plaza that accommodates 16 SARTA buses per hour. The  facility also provides interior and exterior amenities for Lakefont Lines (previously Greyhound Lines) through an occupancy agreement with SARTA. Approximately 200 guests attended the grand opening and ribbon-cutting ceremony for the intermodal facility.

The Alliance Transfer Center is located at 10 Prospect Street in Alliance. It replaced an older, smaller facility a few blocks away and officially opened on November 23, 2008.

The Massillon Transfer Center is now being constructed at a new location at 227 Tommy Henrich Drive NW off of Lincoln Way East and State Route 21. The original Massillon Transit Center at 41 Erie Street South had opened November 24, 2001 and now closed on December 17 2021.

The Belden Village Transfer Center opened on September 1, 2011, and is located at 4700 Whipple Avenue NW in Canton.  The $2.5 million facility replaced an outdoor transfer point at Higbee Avenue NW and Munson Street NW. The building features improved amenities such as a climate-controlled interior, restrooms, vending machines, free wireless internet service, a passenger drop-off lane and interior and exterior waiting areas. The building is also anticipated to be LEED Silver certified and incorporates many energy saving features such as geothermal heating.

Route List 
 4 - Downtown Cleveland/Wade Park Veterans Hospital
 45 - North Canton/Belden Village/Stark State College & Kent State Stark
 81 - Downtown Akron/Akron Canton Airport/Belden Village (VIA I-77)
 101 - Harrisburg/Harmont/Route 62/Walmart (NE Canton)
 102 - Downtown Massillon/Perry Township/Downtown Canton (VIA State Route 172-West Tuscarawas Street)
 103 - Plain Township/GlenOak High School (NE Canton)
 105 - Belden Village/North Canton (VIA Cleveland Ave & Everhard Rd)
 106 - Belden Village/Meyers Lake Plaza/Aultman Hospital
 107 - East Canton (NE Canton)
 108 - Washington Square (VIA Market Ave N - State Route 43)
 110 - Sherrick Rd/Warner Road (SE Canton)
 111 - Gross Ave/Maple Ave/Route 62/Walmart/Stark County Jail
 113 - Southway/Perry (Perry Township/SW Canton)
 114 - Southgate Plaza (Canton Township/SE Canton)
 117 - Stark County Fairgrounds/Cleveland Clinic Mercy Hospital (NW Canton)
 118 - Navarre Rd/Perry Hills Colony/Sterilite & Shearer's (SW Canton)
 119 - Frazer Ave/44th St/Plain Township (NW Canton)
 121 - Whipple Ave/The Strip
 122 - NW/SW Massillon
 124 - SE Massillon
 125 - Massillon/Belden Village/Jackson Township
 126 - NW Massillon
 128 - Erie St/Route 21/Massillon Marketplace/Navarre YMCA/Sterilite & Shearer's
 130 - Alliance North
 131 - State Street/Union Ave
 132 - Alliance East
 133 - West State/Freshley (Alliance Business District)
 139 - Downtown Canton/Downtown Louisville/Downtown Alliance
 151 - North Late Night Loop
 152 - West Late Night Loop
 153 - Canton Late Night Loop (SE SW NE Canton Only)
 157 - Massillon Success Express (Navarre Nickles Bakery/Sterilite & Shearer's/Freshmark Massillon
 158 - Canton Community Circular (Route Walmart Tuscarawas and Walmart Route 62 via Mahoning Road )

Service 

SARTA transported over 2.4 million riders in 2011, up 300,000 from 2010. All vehicles in SARTA's fleet can operate as fixed route buses. Thirty-seven vehicles are demand-response/paratransit (Proline) vehicles. SARTA operates 33 fixed routes as of June 2012. Both fixed route and Proline service operate more than 20 hours each day except Sundays and certain holidays.

The fixed route service fleet covers an average of 7,500 miles per day and reaches within ½ mile of 79% of Stark County's population.
Proline (countywide demand-response/paratransit service) provides on average 140,000 trips a year for customers who meet ADA requirements.

CNG fueling station 

On May 18, 2012, SARTA opened a public/private Compressed Natural Gas (CNG) fueling station at the company headquarters in Canton. The facility is the first public CNG station in Stark County and Northeast Ohio with the next closest located outside of Columbus. The grand opening for the facility was attended by dozens of guests including U.S. Senator Sherrod Brown and Canton Mayor William J. Healy II. The CNG fueling station was certified by the Stark County Auditor's Office Division of Weight and Measurements on June 12, 2012. As of October 9, 2012, the CNG price was $1.89 per gallon equivalent for public fueling.

SARTA plans to convert 50% of its fleet to CNG over the next two years. CNG vehicles are quieter, require fewer oil changes and reduce emissions by over 80% when compared to traditional diesel buses. SARTA also expects to save up to 40% a year on fuel costs by switching to CNG.

Accomplishments 

 SARTA won the American Public Transportation Association's 2006 "Outstanding Public Transportation System Achievement Award" for bus companies serving 1 million to 4 million riders a year.
 SARTA provides extensive shuttle service for the Pro Football Hall of Fame activities.
 On September 12, 2011, SARTA was recognized as a Three-Star Ohio Green Fleet by Clean Fuels Ohio.

References

External links 
 SARTA website
 Lakefront Lines
 Akron METRO RTA
 Portage Area RTA (also runs Kent State Campus Bus Service)

Bus transportation in Ohio
Canton, Ohio
Transportation in Stark County, Ohio
Alliance, Ohio
Massillon, Ohio
Transit agencies in Ohio
1997 establishments in Ohio